Pingxiang is a medium-sized prefecture-level city located in western Jiangxi province, People's Republic of China.

Geography and climate

Pingxiang is a city situated near the border of Jiangxi with Hunan province. It is approximately 110 kilometers from Changsha, Hunan, and about 260 kilometers from Nanchang, the capital.  Most of the area around the city is hilly and mountainous, although the city itself is relatively flat. As a subtropical monsoon climatic city, Pingxiang has mild winters, long and hot summers, with plenty of rainfall. The annual average temperature is 18 °C.

History
Archaeological evidence suggests that Pingxiang was first settled during the Stone Age. During the Han dynasty, it was part of Yichun. In 267, during the time of the Three Kingdoms, it became Pingxiang County, which made it a higher level of administration than what it is today. During the Tang Dynasty (618-907), it was part of the Jiangnanxi Circuit, and was called Yuanzhou. Its name and area of administration were changed many times until 1970, when it assumed its present form.

Administration

Pingxiang has direct jurisdiction over two urban districts, one economic development area, three counties, 28 towns, 18 townships, and 7 sub-districts.

Urban districts: 
Anyuan District
Xiangdong District
Anyuan Economic Development Zone

Counties:
Shangli County
Luxi County
Lianhua County

Demographics
As of the 2020 Chinese census, its total population was 1,804,805 inhabitants, of whom 857,716 lived in the built-up areas (or metro), made of two urban districts.

Economy

As of 2020, the GDP of Pingxiang was 96.360.2 billion RMB, a 3.6% growth over the previous year. Rural per capita disposable income was 20,831 RMB, a 4.9% growth over 2019, and urban per capita disposable income was 40,405 RMB, a 6.6% growth over 2019 (without regard to inflation).

Resources
Pingxiang has abundant water and mineral resources. Five rivers flow across the land which delivers approximately 2.626 billion cubic meters per year. Coal, iron ore, limestone, kaolin, and granite are the most abundant minerals of the city. Even today, the Pingxiangren, or local people, proudly refer to their city as the "coal center of southern China."

Transportation
Pingxiang is a regional hub for transportation. It is about 1.5 hrs drive to the CSX from downtown of Pingxiang. A couple of highways and the main rail line between Changsha and Nanchang run through the city. The city has had a high-speed railway since September 2014.

Tourism
Wugong (also known as WooKong) mountain is a national well-known place for tourism. It lies in the east of Pingxiang, 45 minutes from downtown. The highest altitude is 1,918 meters while the average altitude is about 1,500 meters. Most of the landscape remains virginal despite some necessary infrastructure that benefit tourists.

Yangqi mountain is famous for the religion of Buddhism. It lies north of Pingxiang, one hour's drive from downtown.

Nielongdong (also known as Sinful Dragon Cave) has a tale which refers to Chinese traditional religion and zodiac. This beautiful area is only twenty minutes north.

The historical buildings of the Anyuan Miners' and Railroad Workers' Club as well as the Anyuan Miners' Strike Memorial Hall preserve the memory on the influence of the miners and railroad workers on the communist movement and are open for public visits.

References

External links

Official website (Chinese)

 
Cities in Jiangxi
Prefecture-level divisions of Jiangxi